Notre Dame Catholic High School in Sheffield, South Yorkshire, England, was established in the 1850s by the Sisters of Notre Dame, a religious order. It was, for many decades, a fee paying school. It currently has 1400 students, with a 1:17.3 Teacher: Student ratio.

Admissions
The school has a Catholic ethos and caters for children from all over the city and further afield. The school is co-educational, and has students aged 11–18.

History 
 The sisters of Notre Dame set up the school in 1855 in central Sheffield, moving to a site on Cavendish Street in 1862.

In 1919, the Sisters moved their living quarters from Cavendish Street to Oakbrook House, a Victorian mansion in Ranmoor built in 1860 for Mark Firth, a steel manufacturer who became Lord Mayor of Sheffield and Master Cutler.

In 1935, another secondary school was built in the grounds of Oakbrook House; in 1948 the two schools amalgamated to form a girls' grammar school, Notre Dame High School for Girls, on two sites.

The grammar school was converted in 1976 to a mixed comprehensive, still on two sites. The school finally consolidated onto the Oakbrook site in 1988 when the Cavendish site was closed and subsequently demolished.

Oakbrook House, which was owned by famous Sheffield steel baron Mark Firth and part of the school since 1919, is now the school's Sixth Form block and has been a listed building since 1973. The main school building is a 1930s building with many architectural features including a main hall, known as the salle, with a high vaulted ceiling. As the school has expanded other buildings have been built that complement the architecture of the site making use of local sandstone or red pantiles depending where the building fits in. The Hallam City Learning Centre which is hosted on site has distinct modern architectural merit and receives a mention in the Pevsner guide to the architecture of Sheffield.

The school became an academy in August 2012.

Achievements
OFSTED described the school as outstanding in every way in 2005 and 2008.

School Specialism
It has been a Specialist Technology College since 1995 and was awarded a second specialism in 2005 in Humanities and a third as a Leading Edge school supporting a partnership of other schools. The Leading Edge specialism also includes a sub-specialism on sharing good practice with others around issues of educating able, gifted and talented pupils.

Awards
ICT has been a prime focus of the school; winning the 2009 Becta Excellence ICT Award for the best whole school in Yorkshire and the Humber and other awards including a national award at the Specialist Schools and Academies Conference in 2005 and again in 2007 in recognition of this work. A new environmental learning centre website has been set up and an eco-classroom has been built by the on site Hallam CLC in the school woodland area which makes use of the latest technology to enhance learning and set an example for sustainable buildings as part of the approach to the sustainable schools strategy.

Academic
The GCSE (A*–C) rate in 2009 was the strongest in school's history with the 80% barrier of the number of pupils gaining 5 good GCSE being broken for the first time. The figure including English and maths was well above average for Sheffield with 70% of 5th Year (Y11) pupils attaining these grades, compared with Sheffield's average of 39.9%. It was the second highest for Sheffield in the state sector, with Silverdale School in Sheffield being the highest. In 2007, there were 280 in the sixth form, 111 of whom took A-levels, with an average point score of 84.70, compared with the average of 79.9 in England overall.

Houses
The school has four houses: Picardy, Compiègne, St Julie, Cuvilly, all having roots in places associated with St Julie Billart, the founder of the Order of Notre Dame. There are two school inter-house competitions, the sports day and the house cup, with the latter measuring academic ability and effort of house. The houses are balanced equally, with two forms from each year.

Ethos and traditions
The school's Catholic ethos offers many opportunities for pupils and staff to work together to prepare for pastoral occasions, for example, the whole school Mass at the end of the year, and for the 5th year leavers' mass during May.

Charities
The school contributes mainly to Christian charitable work and the internal charity FOND (Friends of Notre Dame).

Notre Dame Virtual School
The school collaborates with Notre Dame schools all over the world through the Global Virtual Learning Environment 'Notre Dame Virtual School' (NDVS).

Alumni

Notre Dame High School for Girls
 Prof Sheila Hollins, Professor of Psychiatry at St George's, University of London since 1990, President of the Royal College of Psychiatrists from 2005 to 2008
 Judy Parfitt, actress

Notre Dame High School
 Joe Carnall, former lead singer of Milburn (band)
 Jackie Doyle-Price, Conservative MP for Thurrock
 Alex Kiwomya, footballer currently signed to Doncaster Rovers
 Chris McClure, lead vocalist of The Violet May, and whose image is the cover art of the Arctic Monkeys' album Whatever People Say I Am, That's What I'm Not
 Jon McClure and Ed Cosens, singer and bassist respectively with Reverend and The Makers
 Johnny Nelson, boxer

References

External links
 School web site
 OFSTED page for Notre Dame
 2007 GCSE results for Sheffield LEA
 2007 A-level results for Sheffield LEA

Catholic secondary schools in the Diocese of Hallam
Sisters of Notre Dame de Namur schools
Defunct grammar schools in England
Grade II listed buildings in Sheffield
Grade II listed educational buildings
Secondary schools in Sheffield
 
Educational institutions established in 1855
1855 establishments in England
Academies in Sheffield